"I Won't Tell You" is the third single from Lacuna Coil's fifth album, Shallow Life. The single was released to radio on 6 October 2009 and was played on American radio station KROQ-FM and 97x. The single was digital only.

Music video
The music video for "I Won't Tell You" was directed by the Italian director and producer Roberto Cinardi with the pseudonym of SaKu and premiered on the official MySpace page of the band on Tuesday 12 January 2010.
The video was shot in Milan at the BaseB on 5 December 2009 and was produced by the Italian production company Red Rum.

Andrea Ferro, the vocalist of the band, revealed the concept of the video.

And the director Saku explain:

The video was shot with a reflex Canon EOS 7D.

 Director: SaKu
 Producer: SaKu, Alessia Tonellotto, Valentina Be
 Executive Producer: Melanie Schmidt
 Director of Photography: Gianluca Catania
 Editor: SaKu
 Production Company: Red Rum

Chart positions

References

External links
 Lacuna Coil - I Won't Tell You Music Video

Lacuna Coil songs
2009 singles
2009 songs
EMI Records singles
Songs written by Andrea Ferro
Songs written by Cristina Scabbia
Songs written by Don Gilmore (record producer)